The Arco della Vittoria (Victory Arch), also known as Monumento ai Caduti or Arco dei Caduti (Arch of the Fallen), is a memorial arch located in  in Genoa, Italy. It is dedicated to the Genoese who died during World War I, and it was inaugurated on 31 May 1931.

History

In 1923, the comune of Genoa decided to build a commemorative monument while redeveloping an area that was previously a wet meadow. It announced a national contest for the design of an arch to be built on a lawn located adjacent to the Bisagno stream. The stream is now buried under Via Brigate Partigiane

Sixteen proposals were submitted, and the jury chose the draft by the architect Marcello Piacentini and the sculptor Arturo Dazzi. The commission chose it because the design was inspired by Imperial Roman and 16th century architecture, giving the monument a strong, heroic and triumphant appearance.

Piacentini later modified the design of the arch, making it simpler. Construction was carried out by the local Impresa Garbarino e Sciaccaluga, under the direction of Piacentini himself.

The arch is deteriorating due to the action of rain.

Description

The arch is built at the end of a semicircular ramp, and has two side doors leading to a crypt. In the sanctuary, there are some statues by sculptor Giovanni Prini representing Victories, Saint George and the coat of arms of Genoa. There are also other sculptures by Prini, including a reproduction of the bollettino della Vittoria, the bollettino della Marina and the names of the fallen.

An altar made out of Levanto red marble is located at the centre of the structure. A bronze crucifix on a rosewood cross, which is the work of the sculptor , hangs above the altar.

The monument rests on four corner pillars and eight ornate pillars, which are decorated with sculptures by Arturo Dazzi and De Albertis. Two large columns are located inside the arch, and they support lunettes sculpted by Prini dedicated to peace and the family.

The exterior of the monument is decorated with allegories sculpted by Dazzi and Mario Maria Martini, which commemorate the 680,000 Italians killed in World War I and the construction of the arch.

Dazzi's frieze develops in several episodes. Gunners and the Alpini are depicted on the north, while the Red Cross and the field mass are depicted on the sides. The artillery and the cavalry are depicted on the south side, while the Battles of the Isonzo and that of the Piave River are depicted on the sides. The Bersaglieri and the sappers are depicted on the west side, and Benito Mussolini is depicted as one of the soldiers. The air force and the navy are depicted on the east side.

References

Triumphal arches in Italy
Buildings and structures in Genoa
Tourist attractions in Genoa
Italian fascist architecture
Cultural infrastructure completed in 1931
World War I memorials in Italy